Duyar is a Turkish surname. Notable people with the surname include:

 Gürdal Duyar (1935–2004), Turkish sculptor
 Hülya Duyar (born 1970), Turkish-German actress

Turkish-language surnames